Pariaman Station (PMN) is a railway station located in Kampung Pondok I, Central Pariaman, Pariaman, West Sumatra, Indonesia. The station, which is located at an altitude of +2 meters, is included in the Regional Division II West Sumatra. The station is located only 20 metres from the beach.

Services 
There is only one passenger train journey, namely Sibinuang towards  and towards .

References

External links 
 
  

Pariaman
Railway stations in West Sumatra
Railway stations opened in 1908
1908 establishments in the Dutch East Indies